is a Japanese entertainer represented by Ikushima Planning Office. Her business alliance is Harmony Promotion.

Filmography

TV series
Current appearances

Former appearances

Advertisements

Internet series

Dramas

Films

References

External links
 

Japanese gravure idols
Japanese television personalities
1980 births
Living people
People from Saga Prefecture